The 1970 Montreal Expos season was the second season in the history of the franchise. The Expos finished in last place in the National League East with a record of 73–89, 16 games behind the Pittsburgh Pirates. The Expos won 21 more games than in their inaugural season in 1969.

Offseason 
 December 3, 1969: Jerry Robertson was traded by the Expos to the Detroit Tigers for Joe Sparma.

Spring training
The Expos held spring training at West Palm Beach Municipal Stadium in West Palm Beach, Florida, a facility they shared with the Atlanta Braves. It was their second season at the stadium.

Regular season

Season standings

Record vs. opponents

Opening Day starters 
 John Boccabella
 Ron Fairly
 Mack Jones
 Coco Laboy
 Adolfo Phillips
 Marv Staehle
 Rusty Staub
 Bill Stoneman
 Bobby Wine

Notable transactions 
 April 22, 1970: Garry Jestadt was traded by the Expos to the Chicago Cubs for Jim Qualls.
 May 19, 1970: Don Shaw was purchased from the Expos by the St. Louis Cardinals.
 June 15, 1970: José Herrera was traded by the Expos to the Milwaukee Brewers for John O'Donoghue.
 June 15, 1970: Ty Cline was traded by the Expos to the Cincinnati Reds for Clyde Mashore.
 June 22, 1970: Bombo Rivera was signed as an amateur free agent by the Expos.
 June 23, 1970: Don Bosch was traded by the Expos to the Houston Astros for Mike Marshall.
 August 2, 1970: Kevin Collins was purchased from the Expos by the Detroit Tigers.
 August 20, 1970: Floyd Wicker was purchased from the Expos by the Milwaukee Brewers.

Draft picks 
 June 4, 1970: 1970 Major League Baseball draft
Pat Scanlon was drafted by the Expos in the 5th round.
Jerry White was drafted by the Expos in the 14th round.

Roster

Player stats

Batting

Starters by position 
Note: Pos = Position; G = Games played; AB = At bats; H = Hits; Avg. = Batting average; HR = Home runs; RBI = Runs batted in

Other batters 
Note: G = Games played; AB = At bats; H = Hits; Avg. = Batting average; HR = Home runs; RBI = Runs batted in

Pitching

Starting pitchers 
Note: G = Games pitched; IP = Innings pitched; W = Wins; L = Losses; ERA = Earned run average; SO = Strikeouts

Other pitchers 
Note: G = Games pitched; IP = Innings pitched; W = Wins; L = Losses; ERA = Earned run average; SO = Strikeouts

Relief pitchers 
Note: G = Games pitched; W = Wins; L = Losses; SV = Saves; ERA = Earned run average; SO = Strikeouts

Awards and honors 

1970 Major League Baseball All-Star Game
 Rusty Staub, reserve

Farm system 

Buffalo franchise moved to Winnipeg and renamed, June 11, 1970; Jacksonville affiliation shared with Milwaukee Brewers

Notes

References 

 1970 Montreal Expos at Baseball Reference
 1970 Montreal Expos  at Baseball Almanac
 

Montreal Expos seasons
Montreal Expos season
1970 in Quebec
1970s in Montreal